The Anatra D or Anade was a two-seat reconnaissance aircraft built in Odessa, Russian Empire and flown during World War I. It was a two-bay biplane of conventional configuration that seated the pilot and observer in tandem, open cockpits. Test flights revealed a number of design flaws, including weak wing structure that would later kill the company test pilot on 21 July 1917 and poor stability. Despite the problems, the aircraft was ordered into production by the Army, and deliveries commenced in May 1916 after revisions had been made to correct the aircraft's centre of gravity in the hope of addressing the worst handling problems. The type continued in limited service after the war, eventually being used as a trainer until about 1919.

Operators

Imperial Russian Air Service acquired 170 aircraft, initial deliveries began on 16 May 1916

Soviet Air Forces

Ukrainian People's Republic Air Fleet

Specifications

References

 
 Russian Aviation Museum
 avia.ru

D
Biplanes
Single-engined tractor aircraft
1910s Russian military reconnaissance aircraft
Military aircraft of World War I
Aircraft first flown in 1915
Rotary-engined aircraft